Gallojapyx is a genus of diplurans in the family Japygidae.

Species
 Gallojapyx iocosus Pagés, 1993

References

Diplura